Andrei Medvedev was the defending champion, but did not compete this year.

Sergi Bruguera won the title by defeating Diego Nargiso 7–5, 6–2 in the final.

Seeds

Draw

Finals

Top half

Bottom half

References

External links
 Official results archive (ATP)
 Official results archive (ITF)

1993 ATP Tour
ATP Bordeaux